Grasim Industries Limited is an Indian manufacturing company based in Mumbai. Since its inception in 1947 as a textile manufacturer, Grasim has diversified into textile raw materials like viscose staple fiber (VSF) and viscose filament yarn, chemicals and insulators, along with cement and financial services through its subsidiaries UltraTech Cement and Aditya Birla Capital respectively. The company is a part of the Aditya Birla Group.

Grasim is the world's largest producer of viscose rayon fiber with about 24% market share. Textile and related products contribute to 15% of the group's turnover.

History
Grasim Industries Limited was incorporated in 1947.

Indo-Thai Synthetics Company Ltd was incorporated in 1969 in Thailand, started operations in 1970, this was Aditya Birla Group's first foray into international venture. Aditya Birla Group incorporated P.T. Elegant Textiles in 1973 in Indonesia. Thai Rayon incorporated in 1974, this was the second company in Thailand, operating in Viscose Rayon Staple Fiber. Century Textiles Co. Ltd. is taken over by Aditya Birla Group in 1974; this company is a weaving and dyeing plant manufacturing and exporting variety of synthetic fabrics. PT Sunrise Bumi Textiles incorporated in 1979, it produces yarn exported over 30 countries in 6 continents. P.T Indo Bharat Rayon incorporated in 1980 produces Viscose Staple Fiber in Indonesia. Thai Polyphosphates and Chemicals was started in 1984 in Thailand to produce Sodium Phosphates, and has merged with Thai Epoxy and Allied Products Company Limited (1992), Thai Sulphites and Chemicals Company Limited (1995) to form Aditya Birla Chemicals Ltd. This company supplies to sectors such as food, textiles, electrical and electronics, composites, leather, plastics and automobiles. PT Indo Liberty Textiles was incorporated in 1995 to manufacture synthetic spun yarn.

In 1985, the firm's activities in its Mavoor facility ran into controversies after it shut down, first temporarily and later on, permanently.

In late 1990s and later, the focus was the textile business following the end of Multi-Fiber Arrangement (MFA).

AV Cell Inc., a joint venture between Aditya Birla Group and Tembec, Canada, established operations in 1998 to produce softwood and hardwood pulp for the purpose of internal consumption among different units of the Group.

In 2012, Grasim Industries Ltd. and Tembec, Canada acquired AV Nackawic Inc., which produces dissolving pulp.

Listed subsidiaries
In 2004, Grasim acquired UltraTech Cement from Larsen & Toubro. In 2010, Grasim demerged its cement subsidiary, Samruddhi Cement, which contributed 76% of the company's turnover in the previous financial year. Later that year, Samruddhi Cement was merged into UltraTech Cement.

In 2017, it demerged Aditya Birla Capital, its financial services arm, which included consumer finance, insurance and asset management divisions among others. After the demerger, Grasim continued to hold a 55% stake in Aditya Birla Capital.

Operations
Grasim is the largest exporter of Viscose Rayon Fiber in the country, with exports to over 50 countries. Grasim is headquartered in Mumbai and also has plants at Nagda (Madhya Pradesh), Kharach (Kosamba, Gujarat), Veraval (Gujarat), Bharuch (Vilayat GIDC, Gujarat) and Harihar, (Davangere, Karnataka).

Grasim Industries Ltd. supplies Viscose Staple Fiber (VSF). The Group's VSF business operates through its three companies – Grasim Industries in India, Thai Rayon Corporation in Thailand and Indo Bharat Rayon in Indonesia, which also oversees its Chinese operations at Birla Jingwei Fibres, China.

Former businesses
In 2008, Grasim sold its sponge iron business to the Welspun Group for 1030 crore.
 In 2015, it sold its consumer products business to Future Group.
In 2017, Grasim sold its wholly-owned subsidiary Grasim Bhiwani Textiles to Donear Group.
 In 2020, Grasim sold its entire stake in Indo Gulf Fertilisers to Indorama Corporation for 2649 crore.

Recognition
Grasim Industries was ranked 154th  in a list of the world's best regarded firms compiled by Forbes.

In 2003, its Chemical Division was awarded the "Best of all" Rajiv Gandhi National Quality Award.

Grasim sponsored Grasim Mr. India event from 1994 to 2012 that sent the winner to compete in international events like Mister International and Mister World.

It ranked 24th in the Fortune India 500 list in 2020.

Other mentions 
Grasim Industries operates Private Harihar Airport In Harihar, Karnataka. The airport served as an air strip for private charter service.

Footnotes

External links 
 

Textile companies of India
Aditya Birla Group
Manufacturing companies based in Mumbai
Manufacturing companies established in 1948
NIFTY 50
Indian companies established in 1948
Companies listed on the National Stock Exchange of India
Companies listed on the Bombay Stock Exchange